The Valley of Peshawar, or Peshawar Basin, historically known as the Gandhara Valley, is a broad area situated in the central part of the Khyber Pakhtunkhwa province of Pakistan. The valley takes its name from the city of Peshawar, which is situated at the western part of the valley close to Warsak Dam. To the west of the valley lies the Khyber Pass. The five most populous cities in the valley are Peshawar, Mardan, Swabi, Charsadda, and Nowshera.

Districts located in the valley
These districts of Khyber Pakhtunkhwa are completely located in the Valley of Peshawar:
 Charsadda District (population: 1,616,198)
 Mardan District (population: 2,373,061)
 Peshawar District (population: 4,269,079)

In addition, most of Nowshera District, most of Swabi District, and smaller portions of Khyber (including Jamrud), Mohmand, Malakand, and Frontier Region Peshawar are also located in the Valley of Peshawar.

References 

Indus basin
Peshawar District